Topton may refer to:

Topton, North Carolina
Topton, Pennsylvania